William Mahon may refer to:

Sir William Mahon, 4th Baronet (1813–1893), of the Mahon baronets
Sir William Mahon, 5th Baronet (1856–1926), of the Mahon baronets
William D. Mahon (1861–1949), former coal miner who became president of the Amalgamated Association of Street Railway Employees of America
Sir William Mahon, 7th Baronet (born 1940), British Army officer

See also
William Mahone (1826–1895), member of the Virginia General Assembly and U.S. Congress